Kalfayan is a surname. Notable people with the surname include:

Christophe Kalfayan, French swimmer
Krikor Kalfayan (1873–1949), Ottoman-born American writer, lecturer, musician, and musicologist
Srpuhi Kalfayan (1822–1889), Armenian nun
Zareh Kalfayan (1887–1939), Ottoman painter of Armenian descent